

Preseason
The Southern Conference media picked Chattanooga and Davidson as division winners.

SoCon Preseason Poll

Preseason All-SoCon
Keegan Bell, Chattanooga
Omar Carter, Appalachian State
Jake Cohen, Davidson
JP Kuhlman, Davidson
Willie Powers III, Georgia Southern
Drew Spradlin, Elon
Trey Sumler, Western Carolina
Omar Wattad, Chattanooga
Trent Wiedeman, College of Charleston
Antwaine Wiggins, College of Charleston

Preseason Player of the Year
Omar Carter, Appalachian State

Rankings

Awards

Player of the Month

Player of the Week
Southern Conference Player of the Week award is for games through the day before the announcement.

References